The 2001 Australian Nations Cup Championship was an Australian motor racing competition open to drivers of GT style cars complying with Nations Cup regulations as published by PROCAR and approved by CAMS. The title, which was the second Australian Nations Cup Championship, was contested over an eight round series.

The championship was won by Jim Richards driving a Porsche 911 GT3. It was his second consecutive victory, having won the inaugural Australian Nations Cup Championship in 2000.

Calendar

The championship was contested over eight rounds.

Points were awarded on the results of each individual race with double points applied for the single race in Round 6. One point was awarded at each round for the driver who set pole position during qualifying.

Results

Note :  The 64 points theoretically earned by Sam Newman for his seventh place in Round 6 were not included in points totals as published by PROCAR.

References	

CAMS Manual Of Motor Sport, 2001
Official Program, 2001 Clipsal 500 Adelaide
racing.natsoft.com.au
www.procar.com.au, as archived at web.archive.org
www.racetime.com.au, link no longer active

Australian Nations Cup Championship
Nations Cup Championship